Jason Sommer is an American poet and academic.

Life
He graduated from Brandeis University, Stanford University (where he held the Mirrielees Fellowship in Poetry), and St. Louis University.  He taught at St. Louis University, Webster University, and University College, Dublin.

His work appeared in AGNI, The New Republic, Ploughshares, TriQuarterly.

He taught at Fontbonne University from 1985 to 2015, where he also held the distinction of Poet in Residence.

Awards
 National Endowment for the Humanities grant
 2001 Whiting Award

Works

 
 
 
 
 Portulans. University of Chicago Press. 2021. ISBN 978-0226737393.
 Shmuel's Bridge: Following the Tracks to Auschwitz with My Survivor Father. Imagine. 2022. ISBN 978-1-62354-512-3.

Translations
 
 Tie Ning (2014). The Bathing Women. Translators Hongling Zhang, Jason Sommer. Scribner. ISBN 9781476704258.

Anthologies

References

External links
Profile at The Whiting Foundation

Year of birth missing (living people)
Living people
American male poets
Brandeis University alumni
Stanford University alumni
Webster University faculty
Saint Louis University alumni
Saint Louis University faculty
Academics of University College Dublin
Fontbonne University faculty